The Tamarua by-election was a by-election in the Cook Islands electorate of Tamarua.  It was held on 3 February 2009, and was precipitated by the death of sitting MP Mii Parima.

The by-election was won by the Cook Islands Party's Pukeiti Pukeiti.

References

By-elections in the Cook Islands
2009 elections in Oceania
2009 in the Cook Islands